Herman J. Schwarzmann (1846, Munich, Kingdom of Bavaria – 1891, New York City), also known as Hermann J. Schwarzmann or H. J. Schwarzmann,  was a German-born American architect who practiced in Philadelphia and later in New York City.

Early life
Before emigrating to the United States in 1868, Schwarzmann graduated from the Royal Military Academy in Munich, and was commissioned a lieutenant in the Bavarian Army.

Philadelphia
Schwarzmann began working for the Fairmount Park Commission in 1869, and in 1873 worked on landscaping the grounds of the Philadelphia Zoo. He was the chief architect for the Centennial Exposition of 1876, designing Memorial Hall, Horticultural Hall, and other buildings.

Beginning in 1876, Schwarzmann attempted to go into private architectural practice, but was unsuccessful in Philadelphia.

New York City
Schwarzmann moved to New York City and was successful there, achieving national prominence, and working until his retirement in 1888. He designed the New York Mercantile Exchange building in 1882.

References
Notes

Architects from Philadelphia
Architects from New York City
Bavarian emigrants to the United States
1846 births
1891 deaths
Centennial Exposition
Architects from Munich
19th-century American architects